This is a list of American television-related events in 1971.

Events

Television programs

Debuts

Programs changing network affiliation

Ending this year

Networks and services

Network launches

Television stations

Sign-ons

Network affiliation changes

Station closures

Births

Deaths

See also
1971 in television 
1971 in film 
1971 in the United States 
List of American films of 1971

References

External links
List of 1971 American television series at IMDb